This is a list of political parties professing to follow Hindu nationalism or stating that they represent the interests of  Hinduism.

Within India

National

Active
Bharatiya Janata Party
Hindu Mahasabha
Hindu Sena
Hindu Samaj Party

Former
Akhil Bharatiya Ram Rajya Parishad merged with BJS
Bharatiya Jana Sangh precursor to Bharatiya Janata Party
Bharatiya Janshakti Party merged with Bharatiya Janata Party

Regional
Akhand Hindustan Morcha (National Capital Region)
Asom Bharatiya Janata Party (Assam)
Bharath Dharma Jana Sena (Kerala)
Shiv Sena (Maharashtra)
Democratic Social Justice Party (Kerala)
Dr. Syamaprasad Jana Jagaran Manch (West Bengal)
Goa Suraksha Manch (Goa)
Hindu Munnani
Hindu Samhati
Hindu Makkal Katchi (Tamil Nadu)
Maharashtra Navnirman Sena (Maharashtra)
Maharashtrawadi Gomantak Party (Goa)

Outside India

Bangabhumi
Bangladesh Minority Janata Party
Bangladesh Hindu Oikyo Front
Bangladesh Minority Watch
Bangladesh Sanatan Party

Indonesian Dharma Awakening Party (Partai Kebangkitan Dharma Indonesia)

Independent Forward Bloc

HINDRAF
Malaysia Makkal Sakti Party
Malaysian Ceylonese Congress
Malaysian Advancement Party
Minority Rights Action Party

Rastriya Prajatantra Party
Nepal Shivsena

Pakistan Hindu Party

All Ceylon Hindu Congress
Siva Senai (2016–present)
Active
Progressive Reform Party (Vooruitstrevende Hervormingspartij)

Former
Surinamese Hindu Party
Former
People's Democratic Party
Democratic Labour Party

See also
Hindutva

References

 
Political parties
Parties
Hindutva
Hindu